Christian Dashaun Menefee is an American attorney and politician who currently serves as County Attorney for Harris County, Texas. Elected in 2020, Menefee is the youngest person and first African-American to serve as chief civil lawyer for the largest county in Texas.

Early career 
Menefee was born in Houston, Texas and was the first from his family to attend college.
Menefee is a graduate of Alief Hastings High School, University of Texas at San Antonio, and Washington University School of Law. Prior to taking office, Menefee practiced law at Norton Rose Fulbright and Kirkland & Ellis LLP. He noted that the 2016 United States Presidential Election made him want to enter politics, and that the office of County Attorney is "the perfect intersection of law and policy making."

Harris County Attorney 

Menefee defeated three-term incumbent Harris County Attorney Vince Ryan and another challenger in the March 2020 Texas Democratic Primary Election, and won the November 2020 General Election.  He took office in January, 2021. He was the youngest, and first African American to serve as Harris County Attorney. 

Menefee has filed several lawsuits and taken other legal action against Texas Governor Greg Abbott and Texas Attorney General Ken Paxton.  He sued Texas officials over the voting restrictions law passed by the legislature in 2021,  and challenged state officials' demands to audit the 2020 and 2022 elections in Harris County. After state officials auditing the 2020 election announced they would send a contingent of inspectors to observe Harris County’s 2022 general election and perform random checks of election records, Menefee joined Houston Mayor Sylvester Turner and Harris County Judge Lina Hidalgo in calling on the Department of Justice to send federal monitors to the county.  In 2021, after Harris County imposed a mask mandate for government buildings in the county, Menefee filed a lawsuit on behalf of Harris County against Texas Governor Greg Abbott over his ban on mask and vaccine mandates. This led to appearances on national news networks such as MSNBC to explain his opposition to Abbott's policies. The trial and appellate courts sided with Menefee in allowing Harris County's mask mandate to stand.

In March 2022, when Greg Abbott issued a directive to Texas's child protective services agency (DFPS) to open investigations into "child abuse" by parents who provide gender-affirming care to their transgender children, Menefee publicly refused to prosecute civil cases against those parents, publishing an open letter in The Daily Beast.

Prior to the vote certification deadline for the November 2022 General Election, Menefee represented Harris County in a suit brought by Texas Attorney General Ken Paxton to void more than 2,000 votes cast pursuant to a court order extending polling hours by one hour in Harris County on Election Day. The Texas Supreme Court sided with Harris County, ruling that it could count the ballots cast during the additional hour of voting.

Menefee has used the Harris County Attorney’s Office to file a number of high-profile environmental lawsuits, including against Union Pacific in connection with creosote-related contamination in Houston’s Fifth Ward. He has filed complaints with the EPA to investigate how the TCEQ grants permits to concrete batch plants.

In January 2023, Menefee was appointed by United States Environmental Protection Agency (EPA) Administrator Michael S. Regan to serve on the EPA’s Local Government Advisory Committee.

References 

1988 births
Living people
Washington University School of Law alumni
Texas politicians
University of Texas at San Antonio alumni
Lawyers from Houston